XP64 may refer to:

 An experimental series of British Railways passenger coaches
 Windows XP64 computer operating system